The 1956 NFL season was the 37th regular season of the National Football League.

With previous television partner DuMont Television Network ending operations prior to the 1956 season, CBS began carrying regular season games across its network nationwide.

The season ended when the New York Giants defeated the Chicago Bears in the NFL Championship Game,

Draft

The 1956 NFL Draft was held on November 28, 1955 and from January 17–18, 1956 at Philadelphia's Warwick Hotel, The Bellevue-Stratford Hotel and Los Angeles' Ambassador Hotel. With the first pick, the Pittsburgh Steelers selected quarterback and safety Gary Glick from the Colorado State University.

Major rule changes
Using radio receivers to communicate with players on the field is prohibited.
The ball for night games was changed from white with black stripes to brown with white stripes.

Conference races
The Lions and the Cardinals had both finished 1955 poorly, 3–9 and 4–7–1, but both got off to fast starts in 1956.  Both ended up finishing second in the Conference races.

The Chicago Cardinals got off to their best start ever, going 4–0, until the Redskins beat them 17–14 on October 28. At the midway point, they and the Giants had 5–1 records. In the Western Conference, the Detroit Lions roared to a 6–0 start. In Week Seven (November 11), the Giants pulled ahead with a 23–10 win over the Cards. In Washington, the Lions finally lost. Trapped on his own 1-yard line, Yale Lary took a safety in order to get a free kick. That, and Sam Baker's field goal, gave the Redskins an 18–10 lead to put the game out of reach, and the Lions lost 18–17. The Bears, who had dropped their opener at Baltimore, 28–21, beat Green Bay 38–14 for their sixth straight game, matching Detroit's 6–1 record.

In Week Nine, the Lions dropped their Thanksgiving Day game as Tobin Rote guided Green Bay to three last-quarter touchdowns in a 24–20 win.  On Sunday, the Cards 38–27 win over Pittsburgh put them a half game out.  The Bears avoided a loss, while the Giants watched a win elude them, as Harlon Hill caught a last-ditch 56-yard touchdown pass from Ed Brown in tying the Giants, 17–17.  Both the Bears and the Giants continued to lead their conferences, but only by half a game.

The Cards lost the next two games and any chance at the Eastern title, which the Giants clinched, in part because of a 28–14 win over Washington on December 2.  The Western race came down to the Bears and Lions. In Week Ten (December 2), the Lions hosted the Bears and won 42–10, to take the lead. When both teams won the following week, the trip to the championship came down to December 16, the last game of the season, which would have the 9–2 Detroit Lions visiting the 8–2–1 Chicago Bears, who hadn't forgotten the earlier drubbing. The game at Wrigley Field was marked by numerous fights, including a fourth quarter melee involving players, fans, and the police, and a vicious hit well behind the play by the Bears' Ed Meadows that knocked Detroit quarterback Bobby Layne out of the game with a concussion.  So, the Bears exacted their revenge with a 38–21 victory. After the game Lions' coach Buddy Parker appealed to the commissioner to punish what the Lions felt was the dirty play of George Halas's Bears, but no ruling was forthcoming.

Final standings

NFL Championship Game
NY Giants 47, Chi. Bears 7 at Yankee Stadium, New York City, December 30, 1956

Awards
NEA NFL Most Valuable Player – Frank Gifford, New York Giants
UPI NFL Most Valuable Player – Frank Gifford, New York Giants
Sporting News NFL Player of the Year – Frank Gifford, New York Giants

Coaching changes
Chicago Bears: George Halas stepped down as head coach and was replaced by Paddy Driscoll.
Philadelphia Eagles: Jim Trimble was replaced by Hugh Devore.
San Francisco 49ers: Red Strader was replaced by Frankie Albert.

Stadium changes
The New York Giants moved from the Polo Grounds to Yankee Stadium

References

 NFL Record and Fact Book
 NFL History 1951–1960 (Last accessed December 4, 2005)
 Total Football: The Official Encyclopedia of the National Football League

1957